Forest parks are areas of forest managed by Forestry and Land Scotland (FLS) that are managed for multiple benefits, with an emphasis on recreation facilities for visitors. There are currently six forest parks in Scotland.

The first forest park was the Argyll Forest Park on the Cowal peninsula, which was established in 1935.

List of forest parks

References

External links

A guide to Scotland's Forest Parks - Forestry and Land Scotland

 
Lists of protected areas of Scotland